Zanotelli is an Italian surname. Notable people with the surname include:

Alex Zanotelli (born 1938), Italian missionary
Davide Zanotelli (born 1988), Italian curler
Silvio Zanotelli (born 1988), Italian curler

Italian-language surnames
Patronymic surnames
Surnames from given names